The Linganore AVA is an American Viticultural Area located in north central Maryland and includes parts of Frederick and Carroll counties. The area is a part of the Piedmont Plateau northwest of Baltimore, a transition area between the mountains to the west and the coastal plain to the east.  Linganore has a warm and wet climate, with gravel and loam soils. The hardiness zones are 7a and 6b.

The area was designated by Jack Aellen of Linganore Winecellars in 1983, after recognizing the growing interest in regionally produced wines. Jack Aellen worked to establish the first federally designated grape growing area in Maryland, the Linganore Viticultural Area, which encompasses 90 square miles of land around the winery in the heart of Maryland.

References

External links
 

American Viticultural Areas
Geography of Carroll County, Maryland
Geography of Frederick County, Maryland
Maryland wine
1983 establishments in Maryland